Francisco Takeo (born 13 May 1966) is a Bolivian footballer. He played in eleven matches for the Bolivia national football team from 1989 to 1993. He was also part of Bolivia's squad for the 1989 Copa América tournament.

References

External links
 

1966 births
Living people
Bolivian footballers
Bolivia international footballers
Place of birth missing (living people)
Association football midfielders
Real Santa Cruz players
Club Bolívar players
Club Destroyers players
Oriente Petrolero players
C.D. Jorge Wilstermann players
Club Independiente Petrolero players
Deportivo Táchira F.C. players
Bolivian expatriate footballers
Expatriate footballers in Venezuela
Bolivian football managers
Oriente Petrolero managers